P110 may refer to:
 , a patrol boat of the Mexican Navy
 Papyrus 110, a biblical manuscript
 p110α through p110δ, class I catalytic phosphoinositide 3-kinases
 P110, a state regional road in Latvia